Villaseñor or Villasenor is a Spanish surname. Notable people with the name include:

 Fabián Villaseñor (born 1982), Mexican footballer
 Joey Villaseñor (born 1975), American martial-arts fighter
 José Antonio Villaseñor y Sánchez, 18th-century cartographer of New Spain
 Melissa Villaseñor (born 1987), American comedian and Saturday Night Live cast member
 Rico Villasenor, American bass player 
  Captain don Juan de Villaseñor y Orozco Tovar,(1500 - 1576) was a Conqueror of New Spain that served under The conquistador Hernan Cortés.
  Don Miguel Gregorio Antonio Francisco Ignacio Hidalgo-Costilla y Gallaga Mandarte Villaseñor(8 May 1753  – 30 July 1811), more commonly known as Don Miguel Hidalgo y Costilla or Miguel Hidalgo, was a New Spanish Roman Catholic priest and a leader of the Mexican War of Independence.

Spanish-language surnames